The Emas National Park (literally meaning "Rhea National Park") is a national park and a UNESCO World Heritage Site in the states of Goiás and Mato Grosso do Sul in Brazil.

Description 
The park is in the Pantanal Biosphere Reserve, which also includes the Pantanal, Chapada dos Guimarães and Serra da Bodoquena national parks, and the Serra de Santa Bárbara, Nascentes do Rio Taquari and Pantanal de Rio Negro state parks.
The surrounding area is dominated by large soybean plantations.

Flora and fauna 
Emas National Park shows a typical cerrado ecosystem; a treeless savannah with tall termite mounds and an interesting amount of wildlife: the giant anteater, the maned wolf, giant armadillo, pampas deer and the namesake greater rhea, among others.

Emas National Park also holds a small jaguar population, perhaps consisting of about 10-12 animals.

Other larger mammals include puma, ocelot, Brazilian tapir, collared peccary, white-lipped peccary, marsh deer, red brocket, gray brocket, black howler monkey and capybara.

References

Sources

External links 

Bioluminescencia Parque das Emas
conselho consultivo

National parks of Brazil
World Heritage Sites in Brazil
Protected areas of Goiás
Protected areas of Mato Grosso do Sul
Cerrado